Jeremy John Hosking (born 20 July 1958) is a British businessman and political donor. Ranked number 351 in the Sunday Times Rich List 2019, with a net worth of £375 million, he is a shareholder in Crystal Palace F.C. and a noted railway enthusiast.

Career
Hosking was a founding shareholder in Marathon Asset Management that was established in 1986. In 2012, Hosking set up Dublin-listed asset manager Hosking & Co. Marathon Asset Management accused Hosking of breaching contractual and fiduciary duties while working there because he discussed plans for a new business with other employees. In 2015, Hosking was ordered to pay £1.38 million in damages, and a further £10.4 million - half of the profits Hosking received for the period between July and December 2012. Hosking unsuccessfully appealed, arguing profit shares could not be forfeited.

Private investments
In March 2010, Hosking bought Gravetye Manor, a West Sussex country house hotel, out of administration.

In August 2010, Hosking was part of a four-man consortium that bought Crystal Palace F.C. out of administration. On 18 December 2015, it was announced that American investors Josh Harris and David Blitzer had bought a major share holding in the club. Whilst Steve Parish continued as chairman alongside Harris and Blitzer, fellow CPFC 2010 investors Browett, Long and Hosking each retained a reduced 8% investment.

He was ranked number 351 in the Sunday Times Rich List 2019, with a net worth of £375 million.

Railways

Hosking is a noted railway enthusiast, having purchased a number of main-line steam locomotives including 4464 Bittern, 6024 King Edward I, 6100 Royal Scot, 60532 Blue Peter and 70000 Britannia and founded the Royal Scot Locomotive and General Trust.

In 2014, Hosking purchased the London & North Western Railway Heritage business from Pete Waterman and took out a lease on Crewe Diesel TMD that became the base for heritage train operation Locomotive Services Limited in 2017. In 2016, Hosking purchased a 30% shareholding in the Dartmouth Steam Railway and in 2017 purchased the former Hornby Railways factory in Margate to establish the One:One Collection museum.

Political activity
A long time Conservative Party donor, Hosking donated £1.7 million to Vote Leave in 2016 and supported pro-Brexit candidates in the 2017 general election.

In February 2019, Hosking submitted the paperwork to found a new party called Brexit Express, which would welcome Conservative Party MPs unhappy with Theresa May's Brexit plans. At the same time, he launched a public campaign in favour of a no-deal Brexit. Hosking has made major donations to the Brexit Party led by Nigel Farage. He became the founding donor to the Reclaim Party led by Laurence Fox.  In the first quarter of 2021, he gave the Reclaim Party more than £1,000,000 in cash and services. In December 2021, newspapers reported he would continue to fund the Reclaim Party.

Personal life
Hosking has been married to Elizabeth since 1993; they co-own Gravetye Manor after spending their wedding night there and becoming long-standing guests.

References

1958 births
Living people
Alumni of the University of Cambridge
British businesspeople
Private equity and venture capital investors
British people associated with Heritage Railways
Conservative Party (UK) donors